Alex Bescoby is an English documentary film maker.

Early life and career
Bescoby attended Altrincham Grammar School for Boys in Greater Manchester from 1999 to 2006. He graduated from Cambridge University. In 2013, he went to Myanmar to work with the Myanmar Centre for Responsible Business, and to research his book. One episode that gripped his imagination was the last few days of the reign of King Thibaw, the last King of Burma, whose rule was ended in 1885 by the British annexation of Burma. He's an independent advisor to the international development and private sector organisations on navigating political and social issues in fragile environments. He has completed the films The Last Overland (2019), Forgotten Allies (2018), We Were Kings (2017), and Who Stole Burma's Royal Ruby?

Bescoby won the Whicker's World Foundation Award 2016 from the Whicker's World Foundation for his film We Were Kings.

References 

British documentary filmmakers
Living people
Year of birth missing (living people)